"Jin-go-lo-ba" (or "Jingo") is a song by Nigerian percussionist Babatunde Olatunji, featured on his first album Drums of Passion (1959). In Yoruba (Olatunji's native language) it means, "Do not worry."

The song featured "African-derived rhythms and chants" along with "swooping orchestration". In his autobiography, Olatunji said that this was the only song on his first album that he claimed formal ownership of, meaning that it was the only song he received royalties for. American disc jockey Francis Grasso described the song as "rhythmically sensual".

Media

The Fatboy Slim version is one of the playable songs on the Wii playable dance-game, Just Dance.

Cover versions

It has been covered by Serge Gainsbourg, under the title "Marabout" and with no credit given to Olatunji, on his Gainsbourg Percussions LP (1964). 
The song was also covered by James Last on his album Voodoo-Party (1971), by Pierre Moerlen's Gong on their Downwind album (1979), Candido Camero (aka Candido) on his Dancin' & Prancin''' album (1979), by Steve Lee on his album FKW – Jingo (1994) and by Fatboy Slim on his album Palookaville (2004). A cover version was also released by independent dance act the Ravish Brothers (featuring a Hot Funky Daddy Groove) in 1988, in Lightwater, Surrey. The song was also featured in the Hindi serial "Chandrakanta" that aired on DD.

In January 1988 a hit cover version by Jellybean (John Benitez), from his album Just Visiting This Planet'', peaked at no. 12 during a ten-week run on the UK Singles Chart.

Santana version

The song was also covered by Santana, on their first album (1969), though Grasso noted this version was not as popular as the original on the dance floor. Spanish journalist Jose Miguel López stated that when Santana released "Jingo" as a single, it was first credited to Carlos Santana. Only years later the credits were corrected. Other multiple editions of Santana's Jingo single, viewable under a Google image search for it, list the composer as A. Copland, evidently confusing this song with Part V. of composer Aaron Copland's "Statements for Orchestra," which is unrelated.

References

1959 songs
1969 debut singles
Santana (band) songs
Fatboy Slim songs